Crossroads Center may refer to: 

Crossroads Center (St. Cloud, Minnesota)
Crossroads Center (Waterloo, Iowa)